Sharron Proulx-Turner (pseudonym, Becky Lane; d. November 2016) was a two-spirit Métis writer. She investigated themes of Métis storytelling and was recognized as a mentor to other writers.

Early life and education 
Sharron Proulx-Turner was born on April 21, 1953, in Metcalfe, Ontario, and her ancestry is of Mohawk, Huron-Wendat, Anishinaabe, Algonquian, Ojibwe, Mi’kmaw, French, Scottish, and Irish peoples. Proulx-Turner was diagnosed with dyslexia and other learning challenges as a young girl, but on her fourth birthday, Proulx-Turner received a dictionary from her "Nokomis," which in Ojibwe translates to grandmother. Proulx-Turner would point to a word and her, grandmother would tell her a story. This was when Proulx-Turner learned to love language.

Proulx-Turner earned her undergraduate and Master's degrees in English, focusing on Feminist Bio-theory, at the University of Calgary.

Career
Her first publication, Where the Rivers Join: A Personal Account of Healing from Ritual Abuse, was published under the pseudonym Becky Lane to protect her identity as her life was still endangered.

Her writing covers a variety of genres: poetry, memoir, and mixed-genre historical fiction. She is widely anthologized, appearing in Double Lives: Writing and Motherhood, Crisp Blue Edges: Indigenous Creative Non-Fiction, My Home as I Remember, and An Anthology of Canadian Native Literature in English. Proulx-Turner acted as a mentor to writers in the Canadian literature community, particularly for emerging Indigenous writers, and advocated on behalf of the field of Indigenous literature and its writers. She created opportunities for Two-Spirit and gender non-conforming people in ceremony and in writing communities. Spirituality was an integral part of Proulx-Turner's writing process.

In the fourth-grade, Proulx-Turner wrote her first poem and went on to publish a memoir, collections of poetry and a mixed genre historical fiction. Proulx-Turner has also been published in several anthologies and literary journals throughout her career before her death from cancer in 2016. In 2017, her final publication was released posthumously by Kege-Donce Press, in honor of her. Since then, she has had a dedication to her written in the Auto/Biography Studies Journal.

Death and legacy
After she was diagnosed with cancer, the Indigenous Studies Literary Studies Association hosted a roundtable on her works: "Decolonial Solidarities and the Work of Sharron Proulx-Turner" which brought together writers to reflect on her influence as an activist, editor, and mentor. After her death in 2016, the themes in her writing were the focus of a symposium held in her honour, entitled creole métisse of french canada, me, and held November 23–24, 2018 at the University of Calgary.

As she wrote in her book, One Bead at a Time, the purpose of her writing is to: "...give back to the women and children whose stories so often go untold. To give back to the spirits of the Indigenous children that have been and are still missing."

Selected works

Further reading

References 

20th-century Canadian women writers
2016 deaths
20th-century First Nations writers
20th-century Canadian non-fiction writers
21st-century Canadian women writers
21st-century Canadian poets
21st-century First Nations writers
Canadian women non-fiction writers
Canadian women poets
First Nations women writers
First Nations poets
Métis writers
Two-spirit people
Canadian LGBT poets
LGBT First Nations people
University of Calgary alumni
Writers from Ottawa
Writers with dyslexia
Pseudonymous women writers
1953 births
20th-century pseudonymous writers
21st-century pseudonymous writers
21st-century Canadian LGBT people
20th-century Canadian LGBT people